Joseph David Wolfgang Pichler (February 14, 1987 – disappeared January 5, 2006)  is an American child actor. He is perhaps best known for his roles in Varsity Blues (1999), and  Beethoven's 3rd (2000) and  Beethoven's 4th (2001).

Pichler's last film credit was in the independent drama Children on Their Birthdays (2002). He went missing at age 18 under mysterious circumstances on January 5, 2006, near his hometown of Bremerton, Washington. , his whereabouts remain unknown.

Life and career
The fourth of five children, Pichler relocated to Los Angeles as a child to pursue his acting career. He had some success, most notably appearing in several movies and television shows.  With the exception of a handful of memorable supporting roles, he is probably best known for his recurring role as Brennan Newton in the third and fourth (direct-to-video) installments of the Beethoven movies—family-oriented comedies about the antics of a mischievous St. Bernard.

In 2003, at the insistence of his family, he returned to his hometown of Bremerton, Washington (about 16 miles west of Seattle) and graduated from high school there in 2005. According to family, Pichler had planned to return to Los Angeles in the following year (after his braces were removed from his teeth) to resume his acting career. At the time of his disappearance, Pichler lived on his own in Bremerton across town from his parents, his younger brother Matthew "A.J." Pichler and his older sister Samantha.

Disappearance
Pichler was last seen on January 5, 2006. According to the Charley Project, the friends who last saw him stated he was in good spirits while he was with them.

His car, a silver 2005 Toyota Corolla, was found on January 9, 2006, at the intersection of Wheaton Way and Sheridan Road. He was reported as officially missing by his family on January 16.

According to his family's statements to the media at the time, the last outgoing call on Pichler's cell phone was placed at 4:08 a.m., on January 5, to a friend who had said that he had been visiting with Pichler earlier in the day.

According to the Associated Press, Pichler's family stated that a note found within the car expressed a wish to be a "stronger brother" and asked that personal effects of Pichler's be given to a younger brother, but the family did not characterize this finding as a suicide note. Robbie Davis, the lead detective on the case, told the Associated Press that "There's a good indication that it might have been a suicide, but we don’t know that," adding that there was no reason to suspect foul play. His body has never been found.

Filmography

References

External links
www.myspace.com/HopeForJoe

1987 births
2000s missing person cases
American male child actors
Missing people
Missing person cases in Washington (state)
People from Bremerton, Washington
Possibly living people
20th-century American male actors
21st-century American male actors
Actors from Washington (state)